The Thomas Maskel House is located in Greenwich, Cumberland County, New Jersey, United States. The building was built in 1703 and was added to the National Register of Historic Places on June 10, 1975.

See also
National Register of Historic Places listings in Cumberland County, New Jersey

References

Houses completed in 1703
Houses on the National Register of Historic Places in New Jersey
Houses in Cumberland County, New Jersey
National Register of Historic Places in Cumberland County, New Jersey
New Jersey Register of Historic Places
1703 establishments in New Jersey
Greenwich Township, Cumberland County, New Jersey